Gabriel Blanchard, known as Blanchard Le Neveu, (1630 in Paris, France – 1704) the only son of Jacques Blanchard, was born in Paris in 1630, and studied under his uncle, Jean Baptiste Blanchard. He was, in 1668, elected Academician on the merits of an allegorical painting of the 'Birth of Louis XIV,' now at Versailles; but his most successful work was a picture of 'St. Andrew,' which he painted for the Goldsmiths' Guild. He became keeper of the royal collection, and successively assistant professor, professor, and, in 1699, treasurer of the Academy. He died in 1704. Two of his sons, Nicolas and Philippe Thomas, were likewise painters.

References
 

17th-century French painters
French male painters
18th-century French painters
1630 births
1704 deaths
Painters from Paris
18th-century French male artists